Cyanophora is a genus of glaucophytes, a group of rare but evolutionarily significant freshwater microalgae.

It includes the following species:
 Cyanophora biloba
 Cyanophora cuspidata
 Cyanophora kugrensii
 Cyanophora paradoxa
 Cyanophora sudae
 Cyanophora tetracyanea

These species are differentiated based on cell shape, number and position of cyanelles, and molecular data.

The species Cyanophora paradoxa is well-studied as a model organism.

References

Archaeplastida
Algae genera